Kalthifrons is an extinct monospecific genus of mekosuchine crocodylian known from the Pliocene Tirari Formation in Australia. It contains a single species, Kalthifrons aurivellensis.

Discovery and naming
The remains of Kalthifrons were discovered on the western shores of Lake Palankarinna in South Australia's Lake Eyre Basin. The holotype (specimen SAM P35062), a cranium and two mandibular rami, was specifically recovered from the Mampuwordu Sand Member of the Pliocene Tirari Formation. It was found upside down with most of the ventral surface and both mandibular elements being in poor condition. The Golden Fleece Locality, where the fossil was discovered, also yielded a variety of isolated teeth, osteoderms and vertebrae remains, none of which however can be confidently assigned to Kalthifrons.

The generic name derives from the Dieri word for "spear" (kalthi) and fons, meaning forehead, a name chosen in reference to the animal's elongated frontal process. The species epithet is a combination of the Latin "aurum" for gold and "vellus" meaning fleece, chosen to reflect the locality where the fossil has been discovered.

Description
Kalthifrons possessed a small skull, however still larger than that of the smallest members of Mekosuchinae such as Volia, Trilophosuchus and Mekosuchus itself. It's relatively short and broad with a roughly triangular shape and platyrostral (however crushing of the fossil makes it hard to determine to which degree), suggesting a semi-aquatic generalist lifestyle. The skull was at most moderately deep with premaxilla that are narrower than those of most other mekosuchines. The external nares are elongated, longer than wide and almost entirely enclosed by the premaxillae safe for a small area at their posterior margin where the nasals contribute. At their posterior end the premaxillae form a triangular process that extends between the nasals and the maxilla. The maxilla possesses a large dorsal swelling similar to other crocodilians above the enlarged 5th maxillary tooth position. The exact number of teeth is hard to determine as the ventral surface was heavily damaged prior to burial, but based on the remains each maxilla held at least 11 teeth, possibly more, while each premaxilla held between 4 and 5 teeth. At the anterior end of the maxilla these teeth are closely spaced, possibly too closely for the presence of reception pits. Preservation however prevents any definitive statements on the matter. A large, open notch is present at the anterior end of the maxilla at the transition to the premaxillae to receive the 4th dentary tooth when the jaws are closed. This differs from Australosuchus with its semi-enclosed notch. A second notch is present between the 6th and 7th maxillary tooth, which overall suggests that the dentition of Kalthifrons was at least partly interlocking. The nasal bone extends up to the external nares anteriorly and is split by the frontal process at its posterior end. The lacrimals are elongated and irregular triangular in shape with thick preorbital ridges reaching from the anterior end of the lacrimals to the anterior end of the orbits. These ridges are the result of a distinct change in slope, unlike in the Saltwater Crocodile, which has preorbital ridges raised above the rest of the skull. In general the ridges seen on Kalthifrons resemble more those of Baru wickeni. The prefrontals form convex lateral projections as part of the orbital margin. The orbits are located more anteriorly compared to Australosuchus with pointed anterior margins. The supratemporal fenestrae are small, but largely undisturbed by the overhanging bone of the trapezoid skull table. The namegiving feature of Kalthifrons is the peculiar frontal bone, which can be separated into two main areas. The posterior end of the frontal is broad and makes up the intraorbital space. Meanwhile, the anterior end forms a long anterior process that extends far down the rostrum and makes up 64% of the frontal. This process is relatively smooth for most of its dorsal surface, but is covered in rugose ornamentation on its posterior-most centimeter which carries over to the rest of the bone. Unlike in other mekosuchines such as Baru, the supraoccipital does not contribute much to the skull roof and is dorsally restricted to a small roughly semilunar sliver at the posterior margin of the parietal. The mandible is poorly preserved and provides little information. Notably however, the broad and flat ventral surface is offset from the lateral surface by a right angled bend along the ventrolateral margin, a condition also seen in referred mandibles of Quinkana.

Phylogeny
Poor preservation and incongruent nature of morphological features renders it difficult to place Kalthifrons within Mekosuchinae. Although its placement is weak, Yates and Pledge (2016) rule out the possibility that Kalthifrons could belong to any other clade of crocodilian, rendering a position as a mekosuchine as the most probable scenario. In their analysis Kalthifrons''' position varied greatly between trees, with its uncertain nature creating a large polytomy at the base of the group that is Mekosuchinae minus Australosuchus (which was recovered as a sister taxon to all other taxa). Some trees recovered Kalthifrons as an early diverging member positioned outside the clade Kambara + all other mekosuchines, while others found it as a derived member of Mekosuchini (Baru, Quinkana and the dwarf mekosuchines). The strict consensus tree of 566 most parsimonious trees recovered by Yates and Pledge is depicted below.

Paleobiology
Based on the platyrostral, short and triangular skull Kalthifrons was most likely a semi-aquatic generalist predator living in the waterways of what is now South Australia. The specific locality where Kalthifrons was found also preserves a variety of other crocodilian remains, mostly osteoderms and teeth as well as the remains of turtles (Elseya sp. cf. E. lavarockorum). Furthermore a maxilla assigned to Quinkana has been found in the Woodard Quarry of the Mampuwordu Sand Member. The combination of disassociated remains of freshwater turtles and crocodilians and a thin layer of selenite underlying the sand have been interpreted as a sign that the Golden Fleece Locality represents a waterhole that dried up sometime during the Late Pliocene, causing the mass death of the animals inhabiting the waters including Kalthifrons.

During the late Neogene mekosuchine diversity experienced a significant drop with many taxa going extinct in mainland Australia, the survivors including the large Paludirex and Quinkana as well as smaller species that survived elsewhere on islands. Around the same time the first members of the genus Crocodylus arrived in Australia, with fossil evidence indicating they appeared in Australia during the Pliocene, probably having migrated there via the Malay archipelago. Yates notes that the overlying Pompapillina Member of the Tirari Formation preserves the bones of an undescribed, generalist member of Crocodylus, but no mekosuchine remains have been found. The Pompapillina Member dates to the Late Pliocene, between 3.9 to 3.4 Ma, which means the discovery of Crocodylus remains could be the first direct evidence of the faunal turnover from the endemic mekosuchines to crocodylines. However there is no evidence that the extinction of Kalthifrons'' was directly caused by competition with invasive crocodylines and it is equally possible that the later simply colonized newly vacant niches after cooling climate and aridification drove the previously present generalists to extinction.

References 

Mekosuchinae
Prehistoric pseudosuchian genera